The Union of Construction and Woodworkers (GBH) is a trade union representing construction workers in Austria.

The union was founded in 1945 by the Austrian Trade Union Federation.  By 1998, the union had 166,733 members.  Of these, 80% worked in construction, with about 10% in woodworking, and 10% in ceramics and glass.

Presidents
1945: Johann Böhm
1945: Franz Novy
1949: Franz Olah
1957: Karl Flöttl
1967: Hans Böck
1978: Roman Rautner
1986: Josef Hesoun
1994: Johann Driemer
2006: Johann Holper
2011: Josef Muchitsch

External links

References

Building and construction trade unions
Trade unions established in 1945
Trade unions in Austria
1945 establishments in Austria